Dingy is an unincorporated community in Braxton County, West Virginia, United States. Its post office  is closed.

The community was named after James R. Dingy, who was instrumental in securing a post office for the town.

References

Unincorporated communities in Braxton County, West Virginia
Unincorporated communities in West Virginia